Guan Shu Xian was the first and only ruler of the Chinese state of Guan and was a younger of brother of King Wu of Zhou. He was the third son of King Wen of Zhou, and one of the Three Guards responsible for overseeing the eastern lands of the newly-founded Zhou dynasty. Three years into the first reign, King Wu died of an illness and left his underage son, Song, as king. Thus Dan, the Duke of Zhou - who was the fourth son of King Wen - fearing that the kingdom might fall apart under an inexperienced king, took over government affairs as regent. This angered Guanshu Xian and the other two guards, who felt the Duke of Zhou had usurped the throne, and thus they joined Zi Wugeng, the son of the last king of Shang and nominal ruler of Yin, the old Shang capital, and began a rebellion against the regent. This was known as the Rebellion of the Three Guards. Following three years of war, the rebellion was crushed and Guanshu Xian, considered its main leader, was executed and the state of Guan was extinguished.

Even though Sima Qian's Shiji states that Guan state was extinguished because Shu Xian left no descendants, Zheng Qiao (鄭樵)'s Comprehensive Records asserts that Shu Xian had descendants who would take Guǎn as their lineage surname. Lin Bao (林寶)'s Register of surnames of the Yuanhe reign states that Guan Zhong (born Yiwu) descended from Shu Xian, and Guan Zhong's 7th-generation-descendant Xiu, became grandee of Yin (隂大夫) and adopted the lineage surname Yin (隂).

References

Zhou dynasty nobility
11th-century BC Chinese monarchs